Doris Martha Weber (1898 Fort Atkinson, Wisconsin – 1984, Hinckley, Ohio) was an American photographer.

Her work is included in the collections of the Seattle Art Museum and the Akron Art Museum.

References

1898 births
1984 deaths
People from Fort Atkinson, Wisconsin
Artists from Wisconsin
20th-century American women artists